Bouhanifia District is a district of Mascara Province, Algeria.

Municipalities
The district is further divided into 3 municipalities:
Bou Hanifia
Guittena
Hacine

Notable people 
 Emir Abdelkader (1808–1883)
 Emir Mustapha (1814 – 1863)

References

Districts of Mascara Province